Shawei station is a Metro station of Shenzhen Metro Line 7. It opened on 28 October 2016.

Station layout

Exits

References

External links
 Shenzhen Metro Shawei Station (Chinese)
 Shenzhen Metro Shawei Station (English)

Shenzhen Metro stations
Railway stations in Guangdong
Futian District
Railway stations in China opened in 2016